Brazilian fashion industry encompasses over 30,000 formal companies that together move BRL 50 billion per year. The employee count is more than 1.7 million, of which 75% are women.

From 2007 to 2012, over USD 10 billion invested in the Brazilian textile industry, which is the 5th largest in the world - while the confection industry is the 4th largest. Approximately 9.8 billion pieces are produced every year in what is the second largest employer of the transformation industry in Brazil.

External links
Fashion Industry in Brazil